The Wizard in the Wonderland is the 1991 sequel to The Wizard In the Woods and the second book in the wizard trilogy by Jean Ure.

Plot
The plot details the reunion of junior wizard Ben-Muzzy and his friends Joel and Gemma. They visit Wonderland on Ben-Muzzy's magic broomstick, however their fun is interrupted when a race known as the Airy Fairies steals the broomstick. Now the three friends must retrieve it before it is missed by the other wizards.

External links 
http://www.fantasticfiction.co.uk/u/jean-ure/wizard-in-wonderland.htm

1991 British novels
1991 children's books
Candlewick Press books
Children's fantasy novels
British children's novels
Witchcraft in written fiction
Wizards in fiction